Grace Walker (born 29 March 1989), known professionally as Grace Neutral, is a British television presenter, model, and hand-poke tattoo artist based in the United Kingdom. She holds a substantial social media presence with over half a million followers.  In 2016 Neutral was the presenter in an i-D magazine documentary Beyond Beauty.

Personal life
Neutral was born in Dubai and spent most of her childhood traveling around the world with her family until settling in southwest England where she attended the independent school Plymouth College. At the age of 20, she relocated to London, where she now lives and works. Neutral began ballet dancing at a young age and trained with the Royal Ballet, eventually sustaining an injury that ended her ballet career. After this injury she became interested in body modifications and culture, which later became the focus of her career. In 2008 she moved to Bristol where she enrolled on a stage makeup course at City of Bristol College, before moving to London in 2010 where she got a job at the café in Madame Tussauds. Neutral has numerous extreme body modifications including a bifurcated tongue, tattooed eyes, reconstructed ears, a removed navel, and facial scarification.

Career
Neutral entered the body modification industry as a piercer before hand-poke tattooing, a machine-free tattooing method. Neutral previously worked for Good Times Tattoo and attended the London Tattoo Convention with them in 2014.

Neutral is the founder of Femme Fatale Studio.

Television and film appearances
In 2012 she co-starred in Idles music video for their song "26/27" alongside a group of her Bristol based female friends, filmed on location at their home and directed by former Tracey Beaker star Felix Drake.
In 2015, she was featured in the Phaze What music video Tokyo. She is the presenter of i-D magazine documentary series Beyond Beauty, which launched on the i-D YouTube channel.

Neutral's documentary Beyond Beauty with i-D magazine aired on Viceland in 2016. She is currently the presenter of Needles and Pins, a Viceland series documenting tattoo culture across the globe. In 2021 she sat as a subject on Season 8 of Sky Arts' Portrait Artist of the Year.

Books
 Neutral (2019)

References

External links
 
 

1989 births
Living people
British Internet celebrities
People from Dubai
British bloggers
British tattoo artists
British female models
British women bloggers
Dancers from London
British expatriates in the United Arab Emirates
People educated at Plymouth College
British YouTubers